Gerth is a German language surname. It stems from a reduced form of the male given name Gerhardt – and may refer to:
Bernhard Gerth (1844–1911), German educator and classical philologist
Fritz Gerth (1845–1928), German sculptor
Jeff Gerth,  former investigative reporter for The New York Times
Sandra Gerth (1978), German author of lesbian fiction

References 

German-language surnames
Surnames from given names